Slains Pursuivant of Arms is a private officer of arms appointed by the Chief of the Name and Arms of Hay – presently the Earl of Erroll, Lord High Constable of Scotland. It is believed that the Hay family had an officer of arms since the time that the office of Lord High Constable was forfeited by the Comyn family and passed to the Hays. The first mention of Slains Pursuivant is from around 1412 when the Earl of Erroll introduced Slains to a guild in Perth.

After World War II, Sir Iain Moncreiffe of that Ilk revived the practice of appointing private officers. Slains Pursuivant is senior among these officers because his master ranks before all peers of Scotland. 

The present holder of the office is John Malden.

Holders of the office since 1948
1948–1970 Michael Maclagan
1970–1978 Peregrine Moncreiffe
1978–1981 Sir Crispin Agnew of Lochnaw
1981–2009 Peter Drummond-Murray of Mastrick
2009–2016 John Stirling, WS, Solicitor
2016–present R John Malden

See also
Officer of Arms
Heraldry
Pursuivant

References

External links
The Court of the Lord Lyon
The Heraldry Society of Scotland

Offices of arms